Balinge is a village in the Dutch province of Drenthe. It is a part of the municipality of Midden-Drenthe, and lies about 14 km northeast of Hoogeveen.

The village was first mentioned between 1381 and 1383 as Balinghe, and means "settlement of the people of Balo (person)".

Balinge was home to 59 people in 1840.

References 

Midden-Drenthe
Populated places in Drenthe